Aobayama Hirotoshi  (born Koichi Takahashi; April 3, 1950 – September 24, 1997) was a former sumo wrestler from Ōsato, Miyagi, Japan. He made his professional debut in November 1968, and reached the top division in November 1975. His highest rank was komusubi. He retired in September 1982 and became an elder in the Japan Sumo Association under the name Asakayama (now held by ex-ōzeki Kaiō). He died while active as a coach at Kise stable.

Career record

See also
Glossary of sumo terms
List of past sumo wrestlers
List of sumo tournament second division champions
List of komusubi

References

1950 births
Japanese sumo wrestlers
Sumo people from Miyagi Prefecture
1997 deaths
Komusubi